= Nirvana Gounden =

- Born: 1984 (age 41–42); South Africa
- Education: University of KwaZulu-Natal, University of South Africa
- Occupation: Educationist
- Known for: I DO U DO MATHS Smartphone Interactive Books Author
- Website: Gounden's official website

Nirvana Gounden (born 1984) is a South African educational app creator, author and teacher of mathematics. She attended the University of KwaZulu-Natal, specializes in mathematics education, and holds a master's degree in education, Bachelor of Science degree in biological sciences and an advanced certificate in education mathematics.

== Education ==
Gounden attended college at the University of KwaZulu-Natal (UKZN) and the University of South Africa at University of South Africa in Durban, South Africa, where she received her undergraduate and postgraduate degrees, including a master's degree in education. She had worked as a mathematics and science teacher for eight years at The Department of Education in Durban, South Africa.

== Career and publications ==
During her career, Gounden has taught science and mathematics at secondary school level from grades 8 to 12 and has authored and published the smartphone interactive Mathematics Workbooks I DO U DO MATHS in 2017. The books are divided into two, with Book 1 covering algebra (grades 8 to 12), calculus (grade 12) and number patterns (grades 8 to 12), and Book 2 covering trigonometry (grades 10 to 12), geometry (grades 8 to 12) and functions (grades 8 to 12). During the COVID-19 coronavirus pandemic, Gounden created free online mathematics interactive timetables for grade 8 to 12 learners.
